MS Caribbean Princess is a modified  owned and operated by Princess Cruises, with a capacity of over 3,600 passengers, the largest carrying capacity in the Princess fleet until June 2013 when the new , another Princess ship superseded its record. She has 900 balcony staterooms and a deck of mini-suites.

Caribbean Princess is slightly larger than the other ships in her class (and ), due to an additional deck of cabins called the "Riviera" deck.  Another difference is that, being initially designed to cruise the Caribbean year-round, there is no sliding roof over the pool area for shelter in poor weather.

Incidents
On 12 March 2012, Caribbean Princess suffered a problem with her port side propulsion engine that required her to return to her home port of San Juan, Puerto Rico after a stopover in St. Maarten. The problem caused Princess Cruises to cancel the next two trips (scheduled for 18 and 25 March).

Caribbean Princess experienced a norovirus outbreak in January 2014 sickening approximately 200 people on board. The scheduled cruise ended two days early.

On 3 August 2016, Caribbean Princess experienced a power outage while on a British Isles cruise. The ship completely lost propulsion about 25 miles southeast of Dublin, Ireland in the Irish Sea, and was left adrift for nine hours. During the power outage, air conditioners, lighting, hotel functions, and toilets were all functional. The ship regained power and sailed to Belfast, Northern Ireland, missing her next port of Dublin on her itinerary. An ocean-going tug was dispatched from Holyhead in North Wales, UK and an air/sea rescue helicopter from Dublin monitored the situation. The cruise continued without any further problems to either the ship or the passengers.

In 2019, a man in his 30's drowned in a pool aboard Caribbean Princess.

Ocean pollution
On 26 August 2013, the crew of Caribbean Princess deliberately discharged 4,227 gallons of oil-contaminated waste off the southern coast of England. The discharge involved the illegal modification of the vessel's on-board pollution control systems, and was photographed by a newly hired engineer. When the ship subsequently berthed at Southampton, the engineer resigned his position and reported the discharge to the UK Maritime and Coastguard Agency. An investigation was launched by the United States Department of Justice Environment and Natural Resources Division which found that the practice had been taking place on Caribbean Princess and four other Princess ships since 2005. In December 2016, Princess Cruise Lines agreed to plead guilty to seven felony charges and pay a $40 million penalty. The charges related to illegal discharges off the coasts of Florida, Maine, Massachusetts, New Jersey, New York, Rhode Island, South Carolina, Texas, Virginia, the U.S. Virgin Islands and Puerto Rico. As part of the agreement cruise ships from eight Carnival companies, including Carnival Cruise Line and Holland America Line, are required to operate for five years under a court-supervised environmental compliance plan with independent audits and a court-appointed monitor. According to the US Justice Department, the fine was the "largest-ever criminal penalty involving deliberate vessel pollution."

Areas of operation

Caribbean Princess has undertaken cruises from European ports around the British Isles, northern Europe and the Mediterranean and from North American ports to the Caribbean, New England and Canada. The ship in July 2019 left her current home port of Fort Lauderdale, Florida and sailed up to a new home port in New York for cruises to Canada, New England, and Greenland. As of 2020, however, the ship sails primarily in the Caribbean.

References

Notes

Bibliography

External links 

 Caribbean Princess official page (Princess site)
 Fincantieri Ship Building

Ships of Princess Cruises
Ships built in Monfalcone
2003 ships
Ships built by Fincantieri
Water pollution in the United Kingdom
Water pollution in the United States